St. Joseph's Boys' Higher Secondary School is a residential school in Coonoor in The Nilgiris District of Tamil Nadu.

St. Joseph’s Boys’ Hr. Sec. School is commonly known as St. Joseph's College. It is a residential-cum-day School. It was established in 1888 by the Brothers of St. Patrick (Patrician Brothers). The Principal and the senior staff were all Irishmen till the late sixties. The school is still being run by the Patrician Brothers.

The school stands amidst beautiful surroundings on the crest of a hill 1800 metres above sea level, just a few minutes walk from both Coonoor and Wellington railway stations. The mean annual temperature is 18.3 degree Celsius.

The school has a strong focus on football, athletics, music and places equal importance on academics. The school is often referred to as the "Sporting Giant of The Nilgiris", having won the Nilgiris District Inter-School Athletics Championship consecutively for the past 23 years and the Nilgiris District Inter-School Football Championship for more number of times than any other school. The school won the Tamil Nadu state-level inter-school football tournament in 2007 and almost every year reaches at least the semi-finals of this tournament. The school has produced few state-level athletes and footballers. The students are known as "The Josephites".

History

In 1888, the Catholic Bishop of Coimbatore, the Rt. Rev. Dr. Bardou, considered it opportune to start a school within the premises of their 'House' in the Nilgiris. At the outset, before the establishment of our present school, bungalows owned by the Catholic Mission in Wellington were utilized for the education of Catholic children. The Priests of the Society of the Paris Missions conducted the infant institution, which in the early years, had an enrolment of about forty students. With the increasing number of pupils, it was found necessary to shift the School to where sufficient accommodation could perhaps be obtained. Dr. Bardou, with considerable enterprise, obtained an extensive property in Coonoor and the work of the building was started in 1888. The main block was completed two years later and the pupils attending the School in Wellington were transferred to the new building in Coonoor - still under the Priests of the Paris Foreign Mission.

In 1892, the Management of the School was entrusted to the Patrician Brothers who had landed and established themselves in Madras in the year 1875. Under the stewardship of Rev. Bro. Malachy Carew as the first Principal, St. Joseph's set off on the road to success and advancement. Through the interest and patronage of Sir Arthur Lawley, the then Governor of Madras, and the Hon'ble Murray Hammick - 1st Member of Council - the famed 'L' Block was commissioned in 1911. With Rev. Bro. L.T. Fordd at the helm, the Telegraph Training Classes were launched in 1919 to give this Institution the name she is more famous by - St. Joseph's College - until recently. The telegraph classes, due to Government policy, were discontinued in 1929 and the College catered to the all round development of her students who appeared for the Cambridge School Leaving Certificate or the Anglo-Indian High School Examination which was maintained until 1978, when the pattern of education changed to the present Higher Secondary Examination of the Tamil Nadu State Board, the Anglo-Indian High School Examination maintaining the status quo.

With a strength of just forty in 1888, the Higher Secondary School, a name by which she is now known, was called upon to cater to the needs of the growing population with all-round education. After Rev. Bro. F.B. Byrne had given St. Joseph's an auditorium in 1962 and a new chapel the year after, the pressing demands of more educational facilities guided Rev. Bro. K.T. Pius to construct the Laboratory Block, housing the Chemistry, Physics and Biology Laboratories, a Library with more than twenty thousand books and a few language rooms. A block of twelve classrooms was added by Rev.Bro.O'Brien in 1972. With the introduction of the State Board of Higher Secondary Course came the need for the Plus Two Block which followed the building, housing the study hall, the infirmary and the Junior dormitory to perpetuate the memory of that stalwart Rev. Bro. S.J. D'Arcy. Not only was there a demand for more buildings, but also for more modernisation as well. Here we recall the work done by Rev. Bro. Xavier Thonnippara who renovated the kitchen with modern facilities. The Battle of Waterloo was fought on the playgrounds of Eton - a maxim of the Josephites. This prompted the development and expansion of the bottom field which has subsequently been grassed. As a tribute to our hundred years of service, Rev. Bro. M.K. Francis left his mark on the campus of St. Joseph's with a Centenary Block having all administrative facilities housed within. An additional storey over the D'Arcy Hall with modern amenities to accommodate fifty more boarders has gone a long way in easing congestion.

The new millennium 2000 saw the completion of the ambitious project, started in 1998, after many years of planning, the Gymnasium, Indoor Stadium and Auditorium blessed on 8 August by His Excellency Rt. Rev. Dr. Antony Anantharayar, Bishop of Ooty and inaugurated by Thiru. Pongalur Palaniswamy, Hon. Minister for Sports and Environment, who said: "St. Joseph's now has facilities no other school or college can afford in the whole of Tamil Nadu. May the good use of these produce future Olympians bringing glory to the State and country!" The complex houses the Indoor Basket Ball, Shuttle Badminton, Table Tennis and Squash Courts. The school has also become co-ed in 2018.

See also

 St. Joseph's Higher Secondary School, Ooty
 Breeks Memorial School, Ooty
 Hebron School, Ooty
 The Laidlaw Memorial School and Junior College, Ketti, Ooty
 Lawrence School, Lovedale, Ooty
 Woodside School, Ooty
 Stanes Hr.Sec. School, Coonoor
 Good Shepherd International School, Ooty

References

Patrician Brothers schools
Catholic boarding schools in India
Boys' schools in India
Christian schools in Tamil Nadu
Boarding schools in Tamil Nadu
Primary schools in Tamil Nadu
High schools and secondary schools in Tamil Nadu
Schools in Nilgiris district
Coonoor
Educational institutions established in 1888
1888 establishments in India